Lake Arapuni is one of several artificial lakes formed as part of a hydroelectricity scheme on the Waikato River in the North Island of New Zealand.

The dam, at the small settlement of Arapuni at the lake's northern end, was the first constructed on the Waikato, and was commissioned in 1929.

References

Lakes of Waikato